The European Journal of Law and Economics is a bimonthly peer-reviewed academic journal covering law and economics. with a focus on European countries. It was established in 1994 and is published by Springer Science+Business Media. The editor-in-chief is Jürgen G. Backhaus (University of Erfurt). According to the Journal Citation Reports, the journal has a 2016 impact factor of 0.481.

References

External links

Law and economics journals
Springer Science+Business Media academic journals
Publications established in 1994
Bimonthly journals
English-language journals